The 2020 season was Kristiansund's fourth season in the Eliteserien, the top football division in Norway.

Season events
In January, Sander Lille-Løvø was promoted to the first team from Kristiansund's youth team.

On 12 June, the Norwegian Football Federation announced that a maximum of 200 home fans would be allowed to attend the upcoming seasons matches.

On 10 September, the Norwegian Football Federation cancelled the 2020 Norwegian Cup due to the COVID-19 pandemic in Norway.

On 30 September, the Minister of Culture and Gender Equality, Abid Raja, announced that clubs would be able to have crowds of 600 at games from 12 October.

Squad

Out on loan

Transfers

In

Loans in

Out

Loans out

Released

Competitions

Eliteserien

Results summary

Results by round

Results

Table

Norwegian Cup

Squad statistics

Appearances and goals

|-
|colspan="14"|Players away from Kristiansund on loan:

|-
|colspan="14"|''Players who left Kristiansund during the season
|}

Goal scorers

Clean sheets

Disciplinary record

References

Kristiansund
Kristiansund BK seasons